José Peñarroya Peñarroya (Forcall, Castellon, 1910 – Barcelona, 1975) was a Spanish cartoonist of the Bruguera School, creator of famous characters such as Don Pío (about a mild-mannered man and his demanding wife) or Gordito Relleno (about a fat and kindly man people always take advantage to). He also was, alongside Cifré, the "official" cover artist of many of the publications of the house, until well into the 1960s. As a result, he is considered one of the "Big Five" of that editorial of the 1950s, along with Conti, Escobar, Giner (this, in realistic style) and Cifré.

Biography
During the Spanish Civil War he was a combatant in the republican army.

After the war he left his job as an accountant for the study Estudios Chamartín, where he participated in the creation of several short films. In 1947 he began collaborating with Editorial Bruguera, for which he created Don Pío (1947), Calixto (1947), Gordito Relleno (1948) and Don Berrinche (1948, about a man who was always angry). He was involved in several magazines of the publisher, especially Pulgarcito and El DDT.

At this time, he worked with his friends Cifré and Escobar in a rented studio. They liked to catch red pine mushrooms in autumn and joke about it among themselves.

In 1957, together with these and other cartoonist of Bruguera, Carlos Conti and Eugenio Giner, he created an independent company that began publishing a new journal, Tío Vivo, keeping the typical schemes of Bruguera magazines. For this magazine, Peñarroya draw new characters, such as La familia Pi (very similar to his Don Pío) After the economic failure of Tío Vivo, he returned to Bruguera, for which continued creating characters, such as Floripondia Piripí (1958), Pepe, el hincha (1962, about a fanatic of a very unlucky soccer team), Pitagorín (1966, about a kind and gifted child) and Rudesindo el bucanero (1966). He also created new series for the magazine "Tele Chico".

Style
Peñarroya graphic style evolved over the years toward greater statism, abandoning kinetic curves and symbols. An author of a later generation, Joan March, described Peñarroya humor as more subtle, but also more poetic than other authors of Bruguera.

Work

References

External links 
Peñarroya in Lambiek comiclopedia

1910 births
1975 deaths
Spanish comics artists
Spanish comics writers